Rajya Sabha elections were held in 1976, to elect members of the Rajya Sabha, Indian Parliament's upper chamber.

Elections
Elections were held in 1976 to elect members from various state.
The list is incomplete.

Members elected
The following members are elected in the elections held in 1976. They are members for the term 1976-1982 and retire in year 1982 after completion of six-year term, except in case of the resignation or death before the term.

State - Member - Party

Bye-elections
The following bye elections were held in the year 1976.
State - Member - Party

 PB - Bhupinder Singh - INC ( ele 13/10/1976 term till 1978 )

References

1976 elections in India
1976